Crumstown is an unincorporated community in LaPorte and St. Joseph counties, in the U.S. state of Indiana.

History
Christian Holler laid out the original plat of the town of Crum's Point (Crumstown) on April 21, 1875, on the line of the Grand Trunk Railroad. The community was named after Nathaniel H. Crum, an early settler. Christian Holler platted an addition to the town on January 20, 1882, in Warren Township near the junction of the Grapevine Creek and the Kankakee River. The population in 1900 was one hundred.

A post office was established at Crumstown in 1875, and remained in operation until it was discontinued in 1918.

Geography

References

Unincorporated communities in LaPorte County, Indiana
Unincorporated communities in St. Joseph County, Indiana
Unincorporated communities in Indiana
South Bend – Mishawaka metropolitan area
Populated places established in 1875
1875 establishments in Indiana